Steindalshøi or Steindalshøe is a mountain in Lom Municipality in Innlandet county, Norway. The mountain is surrounded by several other notable mountains including Merrahøi and Svartdalshøi to the southwest, Vesldalstinden and Holåtindan to the northwest, Hestbrepiggene and Låven to the northeast, and Steinahøfjellet to the east.

See also
List of mountains of Norway

References

Lom, Norway
Mountains of Innlandet